The 1988 English cricket season was the 89th in which the County Championship had been an official competition. It was dominated by Worcestershire who won the first of two successive championships and also a second successive Sunday League title. Cricket made the front pages of national newspapers, due to the "Summer of four captains" phenomenon that afflicted the England national team, during its five match Test series against West Indies which they lost 4–0. Sri Lanka also toured and played a single Test which England won.

Honours
County Championship - Worcestershire
NatWest Trophy - Middlesex
Sunday League - Worcestershire
Benson & Hedges Cup - Hampshire
Minor Counties Championship - Cheshire
MCCA Knockout Trophy - Dorset
Second XI Championship - Surrey II
Wisden - Kim Barnett, Jeff Dujon, Phil Neale, Franklyn Stephenson, Steve Waugh

Test series

West Indies tour

Sri Lanka tour

County Championship

NatWest Trophy

Benson & Hedges Cup

Sunday League

Leading batsmen

Leading bowlers

References

External links
 CricketArchive – season and tournament itineraries

Annual reviews
 Playfair Cricket Annual 1989
 Wisden Cricketers' Almanack 1989

English cricket seasons in the 20th century
English Cricket Season, 1988
Cricket season